Paramelisa lophura is a moth of the family Erebidae. It was described by Per Olof Christopher Aurivillius in 1905 and is found in the Democratic Republic of the Congo, Gabon and Uganda.

References

Syntomini
Moths described in 1905
Erebid moths of Africa